Natuna Regency is an islands regency located in the northernmost part of the Province of Riau Islands, Indonesia. It contains at least 154 islands, of which 127 of them are reported as uninhabited. This archipelago, with 264,198.37 km2 area, contains 15 sub-districts, including the island district of Pulau Laut, Bunguran/Greater Natuna Island, the island district of Pulau Tiga, the island district of Midai, the island district of Subi, and the island district of Serasan.

With 81,495 inhabitants (2020 census), most of the population are Malays with 11% of Javanese migrants, Chinese, Minang, Batak, Banjar people, Dayak people, Buginese people, Sundanese people, and tiny percentage of migrants who come from Sulawesi, Bali, and other provinces across Indonesia. From 80% of its Malay inhabitants or 65,196 of them, numerous were descended from Terengganuan, Johorean, and Pattanian descent as results of contact established since 1597. The consequence of this is the usage of Terengganuan Malay beside Indonesian language as official language and Malay language as lingua franca across Province of Riau Islands.

Throughout most of its history since the reigns of Sultanate of Riau-Lingga, Natuna were part of Archipelago of Seven Islands/Pulau-pulau Tudjuh/Tujuh which were consisted of Anambas Islands (currently a separated regency in province), Badas Islands (part of Island District of Tambelan in Bintan Regency), Great Natuna/Bunguran Islands, Sejang, Serasan Islands, Subi Islands, and Tambelan Archipelago (part of Bintan Regency). Although government of Kawedanan of Tudjuh Archipelago was dissolved in 1964, its island districts/kecamatan who formed Tudjuh Archipelago still existed until its dissolution in 1999, the sunrise of devolution era government in Indonesia. Along the second half of the 20th centuries, there were at least two historical events that made Natuna: first was oil discoveries in 1969 and second was the Islands history as destination for South Vietnamese refugees in 1976.

Indonesia's exclusive economic zone (EEZ) off the coast of Natuna is slightly overlapped by China's widely disputed South China Sea claim.

History 
The Natuna Islands were discovered by I-Tsing in 671 A.D. and mentioned throughout his notes in A Record of Buddhist Practices Sent Home from the Southern Sea. The most notable history of Natuna Islands followed upon the decision of Alauddin Riayat Shah III of Johor and Green Queen of Pattani Kingdom to claim Natuna Islands as part of their condominium. However, before the Sultan of Johor and the Pattani Monarch declared Natuna Islands as their condominium in 1597, its previous King, Alauddin Riayat II, created Datuk Kayas'/Dukes' titles as follows:
  Datok Amar Lela for ruler of Jemaja Island
 Datok Kaya Dewa Perkasa for ruler of Siantan Island
 Datuk Kaya Indra Pahlawan for ruler of Serindit Island, (later known as Great Natuna Island)
 Datuk Kaya Timbalan Siamah for ruler of Tambelan Islands.

Geography
The Natuna Islands are a 272-island archipelago of Indonesia, located in the Natuna Sea between Peninsular Malaysia to the west and Borneo to the east. They extend in a NNW direction for 300 km from Tanjung Api, the northwest extremity of Kalimantan/Borneo. The Natuna Sea itself is a section of the South China Sea.

The North Group consists of a large island (Pulau Laut), two small islands and several adjacent islets and reefs which lie about 50 km NNW of Natuna Besar Island. Pulau Laut is about 11 km long with a greatest width of 5 km towards the south; it is generally hilly, rising to 273 metres near its north end.

The Middle Group consists of Natuna Besar or Bunguran Island, which contains the bulk of the area and population of the archipelago, together with small offshore islets and reefs; the Bodas Islands (Kepulauan Bodas) are a group of moderately high wooded islands lying close to the southwest coast of Natuna Besar.

The Southern Group (Kepulauan Natuna Selatan) consists primarily of two groups of islands separated from the coast of Kalimantan by the Api Passage. The Subi Islands (Kepulauan Subi) of which the main islands are Subi Besar, Subi Kecil, Bakau, Panjang and Seraya, lie southeast of Natuna Besar. Serasan Island (Pulau Serasan) is the largest of the islands lying further to the southeast and nearer to Kalimantan.

The island had a population of 52,000 inhabitants according to the 2010 census. The principal settlement is Ranai. The island can be reached by scheduled air services via Ranai Airport.

Natural resources
Natuna has large reserves of natural gas (estimated at 1.3 billion m3) that is exported to neighbouring countries such as Singapore. Matak Island now serves as an offshore exploitation base.

Ecology
The Natuna Islands are part of the Borneo lowland rain forests ecoregion.

The Natuna Islands have a remarkable avifauna with 71 species of bird registered, including the near-threatened lesser fish eagle, the Natuna serpent-eagle. Other endangered species include the green iora, the brown fulvetta or the green broadbill.

The Natuna Islands is home to three species of non-human primates: the slow loris (Nycticebus coucang), the long-tailed macaque (Macaca fascicularis), and the Natuna leaf monkey (a.k.a. Natuna pale-thighed surili, Presbytis natunae). A small number of wild goats live on the island as well as sea birds. Over 360 species of bird have been recorded on the island.

Colourful coral reefs are found in the neighbouring waters. The Natuna banded leaf monkey, Presbytis natunae, is among the 25 most endangered primates on Earth.

Government and Politics

Subdivisions 
As of 2010, the Regency was divided into twelve districts (kecamatan), but on 10 December 2014 three additional districts were created by dividing existing districts. The fifteen districts are tabulated below from north to south with their areas and their populations at the 2010 census and the 2020 census. The table also includes the location of the district administrative centres, the number of administrative villages (rural desa and urban kelurahan) within each district and its postcode.

Notes: (a) the 2010 population of the new Bunguran Batubi District is included in the figure for Bunguran Barat District, from which it was split off in 2014. (b) the 2010 population of the new Pulau Tiga Barat District is included in the figure for Pulau Tiga District, from which it was split off in 2014. (b) the 2010 population of the new Suak Midai District is included in the figure for Midai District, from which it was split off in 2014.

Maritime administration and Chinese claim
Indonesia's EEZ extends 200 nautical miles (370 km) from its shores (as per the 1982 UNCLOS), which, around Natuna, means it is slightly intersected by China's Nine-Dash Line, defining its widely disputed claim to most of the South China Sea. In 2014–2015, the presence of the Indonesian National Armed Forces on the islands was reinforced, which the Indonesian government hoped would reduce the chance of any conflict. Then from late 2019, Chinese fishing vessels increased illegal activity within the EEZ, escorted by a Chinese Coast Guard vessel. Indonesia responded with a formal diplomatic protest to Beijing and then deployed to the region a further 600 troops and eight navy warships, along with aerial support. The naval presence included Ahmad Yani-class frigates, Bung Tomo-class corvettes, and Kapitan Pattimura-class ASW corvettes, while aerial support came from Naval Aviation CN-235 MPA aircraft, four Indonesian Air Force F-16s and a Boeing 737-2x9, with BAE Hawk aircraft nearby on alert. A visit to the area by President Joko Widodo in early January 2020 reinforced Indonesia's resolve not to tolerate such incursions.

Economy
Despite important natural gas reserves, most of the locals work as fishermen or farmers. There is no significant tourism industry. Farming is not on an industrial scale, just small holdings. The other main source of income is gained by people working for the government.

Demographics

Peoples 
According to the 2010 census returns (released in 2011), the population of the islands stood at 69,003 people. 85.27% of the inhabitants were Malays, with the remainder consisting of Javanese, Sumatrans and Chinese. By the 2020 census, this had grown to 81,495, and by 2022 it had grown to 85,446.

Religion
Islam is the dominant religion in the islands, with 96.97% of the total population identify themselves as Muslim. Other religions are Christianity, which forms 1.66% of the total population, Buddhism, which forms 1.23% of the total population, and Confucianism, which forms 0.14% of the total population. The largest mosque is located in the north-east corner of the islands. The Masjid Agung Natuna was built over two years from 2007 to 2009, and is visited by at least 10,000 people every day.

Transportation

Harbors and airports
The military harbour was headquartered on Teuku Umar for Navy ships tasked on the Natuna Sea.

Ranai-Natuna Airport is located at Ranai, the capital city of Natuna Regency. The airport is also a Type B airbase of the Indonesian Air Force. Other than that, the airport also serves civilian flights. The airport also accommodates large military aircraft. A new passenger terminal opened in October 2016, inaugurated by President Joko Widodo.

It has one runway designated 18/36 with an asphalt surface measuring 2,560 m x 32 m (8,399 ft × 105 ft). The runway is planned to be widened to 80 m in 2020. Moreover, the airport has an apron measuring 120 m x 60 m and a taxiway measuring 50 m x 32 m.

The recently built terminal at the airport has an area of 3,868 m2, many times larger than the old terminal which only had an area of 243 m2. The new terminal can accommodate around 13,850 passengers daily. The parking lot has been expanded to 5,020 m2 and can now cater to around 3,940 cars and 750 motorcycles. Other facilities inside the airport are the Aviation Accidents Rescue and Fire Fighting building, a generator and the pump house.

See also

 Anambas Islands
 Badas Islands
 Tambelan archipelago

References

Further reading
 National Geospatial Intelligence Agency (2005) "Borneo: Northwest Coast and Kepulauan Tudjuh" Sailing directions (enroute): Borneo, Jawa, Sulawesi, and Nusa Tenggara United States National Geospatial-Intelligence Agency

External links 

 
Populated places in Indonesia
Islands of Indonesia